Graeme David Bridge (born 4 September 1980) is a former English first-class cricketer.

Born in Sunderland, Bridge is a right-handed batsman and a left-arm slow bowler. He played for Durham and the Durham Cricket Board for the entirety of his first-class career. His debut came in the AXA County Championship in 1999, where he took the wicket of Gary Butcher. He never managed to establish himself on a regular basis and was released at the end of the 2006 season. Unable to find another club, he drifted away from the first-class game.

He plays in the North East Premier League for Blaydon Cricket Club, which he has captained. Despite many games being abandoned due to rain, he was a leading wicket taker in the 2007 season, as he has been in most seasons.

External links
Graeme Bridge at Cricinfo

1980 births
Living people
English cricketers
Durham cricketers
Cricketers from Sunderland
Durham Cricket Board cricketers
Northumberland cricketers